Hans-Erich Riebensahm (24 June 1906 in Königsberg – 15 October 1988 in Berlin) was a German classical pianist and music educator.

Life 
As a pupil of Artur Schnabel, Riebensahm was a proven Beethoven player. He often included Paul Hindemith and the forgotten  in his program. In 1949 he became professor at the Berlin University of the Arts. There  and Theodor Breu was one of his students.

Bibliography 
 Hugo Riemann's , 12th edition, vol. 2, . Mainz 1961
 August Ludwig Degener, Walter Habel:  Das deutsche Who's Who, volume 16,. Arani, Berlin, 1970, .
 Christine Fischer-Defoy: Hannah Arendt: das private Adressbuch 1951–1975. Koehler & Amelang, Leipzig, 2007, .

References

External links 
 Zeichnungen und Aquarelle

1906 births
1988 deaths
Musicians from Königsberg
German classical pianists
Male classical pianists
Classical accompanists
Academic staff of the Berlin University of the Arts
German music educators
20th-century classical pianists
20th-century German male musicians